, also known as Fujiwara no Tsugutada and Monozomo no Udajin, was a Japanese statesman, courtier and politician during the Nara period.

Career
In 780 (Hōki 11), Tsuginawa is given the title sei-i-tai-shogun (barbarian subduing general) for an expedition to northern Honshu to subdue the emishi, also known as the ebisu.

Tsuginawa served as a minister during the reign of Emperor Kanmu.

 788 (Enryaku 7, 1st month): Tsuginawa participates in the coming of age ceremony for Ate-shinno (安殿親王) who would become Emperor Heizei.
 790 (Enryaku 9, 2nd month): Tsuginawa was named udaijin.
 796 (Enryaku 15, 16th day of the 7th month): Tsuginawa died at age 70.

Genealogy
This member of the Fujiwara clan was the son of Toyonari.

He was the father of Fujiwara no Otoaki.

Selected works
In a statistical overview derived from writings by and about Fujiwara no Tsuginawa, OCLC/WorldCat encompasses roughly 10 works in 10+ publications in 1 language and 50+ library holdings.

 続日本紀 (1657)
 Shoku Nihongi (1940)

Notes

References
 Brinkley, Frank and Dairoku Kikuchi. (1915). A History of the Japanese People from the Earliest Times to the End of the Meiji Era. New York: Encyclopædia Britannica. OCLC 413099
 Brown, Delmer M. and Ichirō Ishida, eds. (1979).  Gukanshō: The Future and the Past. Berkeley: University of California Press. ;  OCLC 251325323
 Nussbaum, Louis-Frédéric and Käthe Roth. (2005).  Japan encyclopedia. Cambridge: Harvard University Press. ;  OCLC 58053128
 Titsingh, Isaac. (1834).  Annales des empereurs du Japon (Nihon Odai Ichiran).  Paris: Royal Asiatic Society, Oriental Translation Fund of Great Britain and Ireland. OCLC 5850691

727 births
796 deaths
Fujiwara clan